The Vasojevići is a historical highland tribe (pleme) and region of Montenegro, in the area of the Brda. It is the largest of the historical tribes, occupying the area between Lijeva Rijeka in the South up to Bihor under Bijelo Polje in the North, Mateševo in the West to Plav in the East. Likely of Albanian origin, most of the tribe's history prior to the 16th century has naturally been passed on through oral history.

Although the unofficial center is Andrijevica in north-eastern Montenegro, the tribe stems from Lijeva Rijeka in central Montenegro. The tribe was formed by various tribes that were united under the rule of the central Vasojević tribe. These tribes later migrated to the Komovi mountains and the area of Lim. The emigration continued into what is today Serbia and other parts of Montenegro.

Though sense of tribal affiliation diminished in recent years, is not a thing of a past. Tribal association and organizations still exist (e.g. Udruženje Vasojevića "Vaso"). It could be clearly seen during the 2006 Montenegrin independence referendum with the Vasojevići united opposition.

Geography
 
The Vasojevići are located in the area between Lijeva Rijeka in the south up to Bihor near Bijelo Polje in the north, Mateševo in the west to Plav in the east. To the south, the Vasojevići border the neighbouring Kuči and Bratonožići tribes. To the east is the border with Albania, while the northeastern boundary has often changed in the past and gradually the Vasojevići expanded in that direction. Lijeva Rijeka is hilly terrain with forests, interspersed with streams and straits, and the same is true of all Upper Vasojevići. However, in Lower Vasojevići, there are more plains around the rivers, so the mountainous terrain is more gentle.

In modern Montenegro, the area of Vasojevići falls into the following municipalities: Berane, Podgorica, Kolašin, Plav and Bijelo Polje (around 15% of Montenegro). One of the highest mountains of Montenegro, Kom Vasojevićki, is named after the tribe, and the whole area that the latter inhabits is frequently called “Vasojevići”.

Origins

Likely of Albanian origin, the Vasojevići (Albanian: Vasaj, also Vasoviqi or Vasojeviqi) underwent a process of gradual cultural integration into the neighboring Slavic population.

Vasojevići is not a tribe (pleme) of common patrilineal ancestry, but was formed under the rule of a central tribe that extended its name to many other brotherhoods as it expanded in new territory.

History

Early history
The Vasojevići are first mentioned in a Ragusan Senate report filed by Ragusan merchants and dating to October 29, 1444. At that time, they were not described as a tribe but as a people, as they had not fully formed yet but were still a clan organized as a katun typically used by Vlach and  Albanian pastoral communities. The report speaks of the Vasojevići (and of their leader Vaso) as when, together with the Bjelopavlići and the Piperi, they attacked Ragusan merchants and did some material damage to them near the village of Rječica (now Lijeva Rijeka). The Vasojevići are not mentioned in the Vranjina treaty of 1455, which may be explained by the fact that at that time they were apparently a small community in the territory of Piperi, which in the second half of the 15th century encompassed present-day Bratonožići and Lijeva Rijeka. The Vasojevići are mentioned in the 1485 Ottoman defter of Shkodër, where the village of Rječica was known by the alternative name of Vasojević.
According to this defter, the Vasojevići and Bratonožići were not yet established tribes and the formation of the Vasojevići as a tribe was a long process that most likely lasted until the end of the 16th century, when they separated from the nahiyah of Piperi as a separate and fully formed tribal unit.

17th century
In 1613, the Ottomans launched a campaign against the rebel tribes of Montenegro. In response, Vasojevići along with the tribes of Kuči, Bjelopavlići, Piperi, Kastrati, Kelmendi, Shkreli and Hoti formed a political and military union known as “The Union of the Mountains” or “The Albanian Mountains”. In their shared assemblies, the leaders swore an oath of besa to resist with all their might any upcoming Ottoman expeditions, thereby protecting their self-government and disallowing the establishment of the authority of the Ottoman Spahis in the northern highlands. Their uprising had a liberating character, with the aim of getting rid of the Ottomans from their territories.
Mariano Bolizza recorded in 1614 that Vasojevići had a total of 90 houses, of the Serbian Orthodox faith. It was commanded by Nicolla Hotaseu (Nikolla Hotasev) and Lale Boiof (Lale Bojov) and could field up to 280 soldiers.

In 1658, the seven tribes of Kuči, Vasojevići, Bratonožići, Piperi, Kelmendi, Hoti and Gruda allied themselves with the Republic of Venice, establishing the so-called “Seven-fold banner” or “alaj-barjak”, against the Ottomans. In 1689, an uprising broke out in Piperi, Rovca, Bjelopavlići, Bratonožići, Kuči and Vasojevići, while at the same time an uprising broke out in Prizren, Peć, Priština and Skopje, and then in Kratovo and Kriva Palanka in October (Karposh's Rebellion).

18th and 19th century
During the Austro-Turkish War, which began in 1737, the Serbian patriarch Arsenije IV Jovanović Šakabenta organized an uprising and the Orthodox population of Serbia and the Brda revolted. Alongside the patriarch, chiefs of the Vasojevići and other Brda tribes joined the Austrian forces in Serbia and helped them take Niš and Novi Pazar, in July 1737. Led by the Serbian patriarch and the voivode Radonja Petrović of the Kuči tribe, another 3,000 highlanders arrived in a deserted Novi Pazar, a day after the Austrian forces had withdrawn. On their way home, some of the Vasojevići and Kuči highlanders looted and burned Bihor. The Ottoman reprisals against the insurgents began in October 1737 and had terrible consequences for the people living in the valleys of the Ibar, West Morava, Lim and Tara rivers. The Ottoman army of Hodaverdi Pasha Mahmudbegović burned and destroyed every village in its path, which caused the migration of thousands of Serbs and also Catholic Albanians. By the end of 1737, the Ottoman army had ravaged the entire Vasojevići region, burning and destroying almost every village from Bijelo Polje to the Komovi Mountains. Most of the churches and monasteries were also burnt and destroyed, such as the monasteries of Đurđevi Stupovi and Šudikovo in 1738, the latter never being rebuilt. The defeat of Austria against the Ottomans led to a massive migration of the population of the Upper Lim valley, which became depopulated while part of its inhabitants was enslaved or even exiled to Metohija in 1739.

The Upper Vasojevići region was de facto incorporated into the Principality of Montenegro in 1858, after the Battle of Grahovac, and confirmed 20 years later by the Treaty of Berlin, while the Lower Vasojevići area remained under Ottoman rule.

In 1860, the Montenegrin government, as part of an assimilation campaign, issued an order that certain embroideries and ornaments were to be removed from various parts of the Vasojevići women's costume, such as the džupeleta, jackets or aprons, and that traditional Montenegrin costumes were to be worn instead. Later on officials were sent to Vasojevići to enforce the ruling. Despite, the women of the Vasojevići tribe would retain their traditional folk costume until the beginning of 20th century.

20th century
At the beginning of the 20th century, while still under Ottoman rule, the Lower Vasojevići had become radicalized and were quick to stir up trouble. In a region on the border between Montenegro and the Ottoman Empire, this was a challenge for both states. In 1911, an Ottoman offer to bring the Lower Vasojevići back under the authority of the Porte was not successful. Failing to pacify the tribesmen, the Ottoman authority decided to recruit and send them away from their homeland. This had the unexpected result that the Lower Vasojevići revolted in the summer of 1912, with the support of the Montenegrins. With the help of paramilitaries from Rugova, Plav, Gusinje and other neighboring areas, the Ottoman regular army was able to suppress the revolt and devastated the Lower Vasojevići villages and crops, while the monastery of Đurđevi stupovi was looted and burned.

During World War I, the Kingdom of Montenegro was occupied by the Austro-Hungarian army from January 1916 until the end of the war. A prominent member of the Vasojevići, the Brigadier-General Radomir Vešović was given the task of disbanding the Montenegrin army and negotiating terms with the occupying forces. Having failed to do so, the general killed the man sent by the Austrians to arrest him. This act of defiance triggered a resistance movement in Montenegro, especially among Vešović's Vasojevići kinsmen, followed by a harsh campaign of reprisals by the Austrians.

Following the end of the war, a Great National Assembly was held in Podgorica, on 19 November 1918, to decide the future status of Montenegro. The election resulted in a victory for the Whites, who supported unilateral unification with Serbia, while those who saw it as an annexation of Montenegro by Serbia were called the Greens. Together with the Bjelopavlići, the Drobnjaci, part of the Nikšići and the Grahovljani, the Vasojevići were among the tribes that supported the Whites and, after their victory, celebrated an effective pan-Serbianism.

World War II
During the Second World War, the Vasojevići were divided between the two armies of Serb Chetniks (royalists) and Yugoslav Partisans (communists) that were fighting each other (vojvoda Pavle Đurišić formed the most successful Chetnik units out of mainly Vasojevići). As a result, the conflict spread within the tribal structures. The partisans formed a distinct Vasojević battalion. In battles, against Chetniks and the Fascist Italian army, it routed 200 Chetniks and 160 Italian soldiers in defense of the position of Pešića Lake during the advance of the Chetniks from Kolašin.

21st century

In May 2006, Montenegro gained independence after a referendum on the future of the State Union of Serbia and Montenegro. However, 72% of voters in Andrijevica municipality, the unofficial centre of the Vasojevići region, voted against Montenegrin independence. It was the second highest result against breaking the state union with Serbia (after Pluzine municipality).The result can be explained by the fact that historically, the Vasojevići had strong ties with Serbia.

The People's Assembly of Vasojevići stated many times that, apart from being Montenegrin, all Vasojevići are Serb and, thus, strongly oppose and have always opposed Montenegrin secession from Yugoslavia. The Montenegrin census of 2003 revealed that 89,81% of the Vasojevići declared themselves as Serb while 9,43% declared themselves as Montenegrin. In the 2011 census, in most settlements linked to the Vasojevići the majority identified themselves as Serbs. In Andrijevica about 2/3 identified as Serbs and 1/3 as Montenegrins.

2010s
During the War in Ukraine, some locals of villages of Andrijevica, part of the Vasojevići tribe, decided to sell and give up land for free to Russia, stating that "we are brothers".

Anthropology

Culture

It is a tradition of all brotherhoods to show respect to ancestors by knowing precisely genealogy and the history of the tribe and a family. This also allows members of the clan to be unite, to act together and always to recognise kin. In terms of traditional customs, up to the end of the 19th century traces of a variant of the northern Albanian kanuns  remained in use in Vasojevići. Two story houses were known as Kula

The traditional clothing of the Vasojevići resembles that of other tribes of the Albanian-Montenegrin borderland. In particular, the woman's garment, a woolen bell-shaped skirt called oblaja or džupeleta (the latter came through Turkish from the Arabic jubba), is similar to the xhubleta worn by Albanian women from neighbouring Malisor tribes.

Srbljaci and Ašani
From their first mentions in the mid-15th century until the end of the 17th century, the Vasojevići remained in their Brda cradle, the centre of which was Lijeva Rijeka. At that time, the neighbouring upper Lim valley was inhabited by Serbs, with whom the Vasojevići were in regular contact and whom they called Srbljaci. However, these original Srbljaci emigrated en masse after 1651 and were slowly replaced by various brotherhoods and families from Montenegro and the Brda. The Vasojevići themselves gradually expanded into the upper Lim valley in the 18th century and began to call all the other brotherhoods and families they encountered Srbljaci, whether they were recent newcomers from other Brda or Montenegrin tribes, or remaining descendants of the original Srbljaci.

At the same time a similar term emerged, Ašani, which the Vasojevići used to refer to people living in Has, the name then given to the region around Berane. The name Has was then used by the Ottomans to designate an administrative unit of which Berane was the center, and its inhabitants were called the Ašani not only by the Vasojevići, but by the mountain tribes in general. And since Berane was at that time inhabited only by Srbljaci, the name Ašanin acquired the same meaning as Srbljak in the region.

Therefore, while Srbljaci originally had a broader meaning than Ašani, the two terms gradually became synonymous with each other. Thus, since the 19th century, both terms have been used to refer to people of another origin living in the Vasojevići region.

Folk traditions
The Vasojevići are considered to be one family or clan, descended from a single male ancestor called Vasoje. There are various folk tales about this ancestor, and the aforementioned Vasoje stands out among them, as does Vaso, who is said to be his descendant, although these two names are often mixed up in different legends. This eponymous ancestor is said to have settled in Lijeva Rijeka at a time when the area was desolate, where he would have built a house on the right bank of the Nožica stream. Among the legends about the origins of the tribe, one considers that Vasoje was the grandson of Vukan Nemanjić and that Vaso was himself the great grandson of Vasoje. According to a folk myth, the three Vasojevići brotherhoods are descended from Raje, Novak and Mioman, the three sons of Vaso.

Vaso's descendants gradually expanded to the north-east and inhabited the region by the river Lim, called Polimlje – the area around the Komovi mountains, Andrijevica and Berane. Thus, they formed the largest tribe (pleme) of all seven highland tribes of Montenegro (i.e. Vasojevići, Moračani, Rovčani, Bratonožići, Kuči, Piperi and Bjelopavlići). Part of the tribe that stayed free from the Turkish rule lives in the area of Lijeva Rijeka and Andrijevica (Upper Nahija) – they are all called Upper Vasojevići. Lower Vasojevici (or Lower Nahija) inhabited the area of Berane. Most of the Lower Vasojevići were within the Turkish reign until Balkan Wars in the 20th century.

Johann Georg von Hahn recorded one of the first oral traditions about Vasojevići from a Catholic priest named Gabriel in Shkodër in 1850. According to it the first direct male ancestor of the Vasojevići was Vas Keqi, son of a Keq who fleeing from Ottoman conquest settled in a Slavic-speaking area that would become the historical Piperi region. His sons, the brothers Lazër Keqi (ancestor of Hoti), Ban Keqi (ancestor of Triepshi), Kaster Keqi (ancestor of Krasniqi) and Merkota Keqi (ancestor of Mrkojevići) had to abandon the village after committing murder against the locals, but Keq and his younger son Piper Keqi remained there and Piper Keqi became the direct ancestor of the Piperi tribe.

In the 18th century, the folklore of the tribe was influenced by the Orthodox millenarianism that had developed during the mid Ottoman era. According to one such folk legend, an elder of the Vasojevići, Stanj, foretold Greek priests the advent of a Serbian messiah, a dark man (crni čovjek) who would liberate the Serbs from the Turks. These myths as part of the official Serbian Orthodox doctrine provided both a de facto recognition of Ottoman rule and the denial of its legitimacy.

Ethnographic accounts

According to a memorandum created by the Austro-Hungarian consul F.Lippich, which studied the demographic structure of the area, the Vasojevići are considered the northern linguistic border of Albanian and constitute a case of slavicised Albanians.

Marie Amelie von Godin in her travels still reported traces of bilingualism in the area of Vasojevici. According to her reports, although Albanian was no longer spoken in the area, some laments  and oaths were still being sung and recited in Albanian.

Brotherhoods
The people of Vasojevići consider themselves as the descendants of three Vaso sons: Rajo, Novak and Mioman. Hence the three great clans of the tribe:
 Rajevići
 Novakovići
 Miomanovići

In his book Pleme Vasojevići, published in 1935, the historian Radoslav Vešović, who was a member of the tribe, describes the structure of the Vasojevići. The list of families was exhaustive at the time of writing, but new families may have developed since then. It happens that with a very distant genealogy, slight variations of names, chronology and relationships exist simultaneously, but there is no doubt among the Vasojevići members as to which family belongs to which brotherhood, branch and sub-branch. In fact, no Vasojevići family has ever questioned the structure described below.

Rajevići is the biggest branch. It is in turn divided into three branches (again after Raja's sons or grandsons: Đuro, Dabet and Uglješa Damir-Kovač).

Families that descend from Lopaćani are:
 Raketići
 Marsenići
 Popovići
 Radulovići
 Vešovići
 Vulevići
 Bojovići
 Đukići
 Miloševići and Velidžinkići
 Čukići
 Golubovići and Lalevići
 Dragićiević
 Ivanovići
 Mikovići
 Novovići
 Pavićievići
 Raičevići
 Vasović
 Neradovići
 Aleksići
 Spasojevići
 Vukašinovići
 Stojanovići and Stojkovići
 Vukićevići and Boričići
 Labani and Mijovići
 Ivanovići
 Jelići
 Kiković
 Mirkovići
 Perovići
 Radovojevići
 Radunovići
 Ugrenovići
 Vukanići
 Karadžići and Sakovići
 Folići
 Zulevići

Families that are descendants of Dabetići are:
 Deletići
 Đekići
 Lekići
 Mirčići
 Novovići
 Rajovići
 Vukovići
 Labovići
 Ćirovići
 Grozdanići
 Rosnići
 Lazarevići
 Kuburovići
 Laskovići
 Osmajlići
 Stanisavići – Ilići
 Radunović – Labani
 Vulinići (or Vuline)
 Dragojevići
 Ivanovići
 Zonjići
 Arsenijevići
 Protići
 Vuksanovići
 Lakićevići
 Stanići
 Lalići
 Ostojići
 Lašići
 Žurići
 Kojići
 Mitrovići
 Palevići and Garčevići

Families of Kovačevići branch are:
 Kastratovići
 Mićovići
 Vojvodići
 Đurišići with Martinovići and Jojići
 Bradići
 Đurkovići
 Marijanovići
 Medonići
 Otaševići
 Plavšići
 Rakići
 Ružići
 Simovići (Carevići)
 Stanići
 Obradovići
 Jokići
 Miketići
 Savići
 Vučevići
 Vuksanovići
 Zekići
 Katanići (Raičevići)
 Aletići
 Bacanovići
 Novičići
 Šarovići
 Vulići
 Dedovići
 Đinovići
 Milovići
 Tajići

Novakovići is the second biggest branch. Novak had three sons (Nikač, Vuksan/Vuica and Rečko), of which all families hail from:

All the families of Novakovići brotherhood are as follows:
 Dragovići
 Lekići
 Adžići
 Babovići
 Lakovići
 Vukovići
 Ćulafići
 Mimovići
 Milikići
 Tomovići
 Radevići and Đekići
 Mujovići
 Kićovići
 Lakušići
 Račići
 Jelići
 Vukići
 Asanovići
 Boričići
 Ljubići
 Mišovići
 Nikolići
 Pantovići
 Radunovići
 Ivanovići
 Malevići
 Radonjići
 Dujovići and Marnići
 Bakići
 Prelići
 Orovići
 Kočanovići
 Pajovići
 Salevići
 Bandovići
 Đekovići
 Radojevići
 Radosavljevići
 Vukadinovići
 Matovići
 Žujovići

Miomanovići is the smallest brotherhood of the Vasojevići. The families are:
 Delevići
 Cemovići
 Joksimovići
 Mićovići and Boičići
 Ćeranići
 Markovići
 Štipalji
 Zečevići
 Saičići
 Maslovarići
 Dubaci
 Gubernići
 Fatići
 Novovići
 Miškovići
 Vukovići
 Leposavići
 Đerkovići
 Turovići
 Jovovići
 Vučeljići
 Vujovići
 Savovići
 Vukičevići
 Stijovići
 Ćorac-Šunjevići
 Bajići and Šarbajići
 Mališići and Nedići
 Kruščići
 Vučetići

Notable people

By the beginning of World War II, there were around 3,600 Vasojevići “houses” in Polimlje and Lijeva Rijeka. Many famous Serbs, Montenegrins, or people of Serbian or Montenegrin descent, are Vasojevići by origin, e.g.:
 Karađorđe Petrović, Serbian revolutionary, leader of the Serbian Revolution and first Grand Vožd of Serbia
 Slobodan Milošević - former President of Serbia and of Yugoslavia.
 Radomir Vešović - War Minister of the Kingdom of Montenegro, General of Division in III Army of Kingdom of SHS.
 Gavro Vuković - a jurist, senator of the Principality of Montenegro, a military commander, Yugoslav politician and writer.
 Avram Cemović, military officer who commanded Montenegrin units that captured Berane from Ottomans 
 Momčilo Cemović - Presidents of the Executive Council of the Socialist Republic of Montenegro (Prime Minister) from 1978 till 1982. Finance Minister of Yugoslavia from 1974 to 1978.
 Milla Jovovich - American actress, model, and musician 
 Petar Bojović - one of four famous Serbian vojvode (field-marshal) in Balkan Wars and World War I.
 Đorđije Lašić, Montenegrin Serb military officer of the Royal Yugoslav Army.
 Dragan Nikolić - one of the most recognizable actors in Serbian cinema.
 Puniša Račić - Serbian and Yugoslav Radical politician who, in 1928, assassinated Croatian politician Stjepan Radić.
 Svetozar Marković - an influential Serbian political activist of the 19th century.
 Mihailo Lalić - a famous novelist of Serbian and Montenegrin literature. He is considered by some to be among the greatest Montenegrin authors.
 Radovan Zogović - one of the greatest Montenegrin poets of the 20th century.
 Jelena Janković - a Serbian professional female tennis player - formerly nr 1 ranked player in a WTA list.
 Milutin Šoškić - a legendary Serbian goalkeeper who played for SFR Yugoslavia.
 Borislav Milošević - Serbian diplomat 
 Sofija Milošević - Serbian fashion model
 Žarko Obradović - Serbian politician and a former Minister of Education in the Government of Serbia.
 Slavica Đukić Dejanović - Serbian politician, former Minister of Health and former President of the National Assembly of Serbia
 Ljubiša Jokić - former general in the Military of Serbia and Montenegro
 Divna Veković - first female medical doctor in Montenegro.
 Vjera Mujović -an actress and writer of novels
 Lidija Vukićević - Serbian actress and politician
 Slavko Labović - Serbian-Danish actor
 Milija and Pavle Bakić, co-founders of Galatasaray football club
 Dragan Labović - Serbian basketball player
 Budislav Šoškić - Montenegrin communist and President of the People's Assembly of Socialist Republic of Montenegro 
 Dejan Šoškić - Serbian economist, former Governor of the National Bank of Serbia
 Milić Vukašinović - drummer, rock singer and guitarist, most notable for his stint with Bijelo dugme.
 Bora Đorđević, famous Serbian musician and singer
 Željko Joksimović, famous Serbian musician and singer
 Boban Rajović, famous Montenegrin folk singer
 Blažo Rajović, Montenegrin footballer
 Goran Vukošić, popular Montenegrin folk singer
 Marko Vešović, Montenegrin footballer
 Siniša Dobrašinović, Montenegrin-born Cypriot football player
 Žarko Zečević, former Serbian basketball player, former football administrator and businessman
 Vladimir Dašić, Montenegrin basketball player
 Bojan Bakić, Montenegrin basketball player
 Boris Bakić, Montenegrin basketball player
 Ivan Djurkovic, Montenegrin handball player
 Sonja Barjaktarović, Montenegrin handball player
 Tanja Bakić. Montenegrin poet, essay and non-fiction writer
 Vasilije Tomović, Montenegrin chess master
 Mitar Milošević famous writer
 Đorđije Pajković -Montenegrin Yugoslav politician, Presidents of the Executive Council of the Socialist Republic of Montenegro (Prime Minister) from 1962-1963
 Čedo Vuković - Montenegrin writer
 Stefan Babović - Serbian football player currently playing for FK Partizan and the Serbia national football team.
 Branislav Šoškić - Montenegrin economist and politician, President of the Socialist Republic of Montenegro's Presidency in 1985-1986
 Stevo Vasojević* - legendary ancestor of the Vasojevići tribe and character in the Kosovo Cycle
 Hadži-Prodan Gligorijević - Serbian voivode in the First Serbian Uprising

References

Bibliography

External links

 http://sites.google.com/site/vasojevici

 
Tribes of Montenegro
Andrijevica Municipality
Berane Municipality
Montenegrin people of Albanian descent